The 1894 West Virginia Mountaineers football team represented West Virginia University during the 1894 college football season. In their second and final season under head coach F. William Rane, the Mountaineers compiled a 2–2 record and were outscored by opponents by a combined total of 52 to 28. George H. A. Kunst was the team captain.

Schedule

References

West Virginia
West Virginia Mountaineers football seasons
West Virginia Mountaineers football